is a Japanese manga by Miyoko Motomura. It was adapted into television dramas in 1970 and 2011.

Cast
Tetsuo Ishidate (1970 TV series)
Yuki Okazaki (1970 TV series)
Takanori Nishikawa (2011 TV series)
Natsuna Watanabe (2011 TV series)

References

1970 Japanese television series debuts
2011 Japanese television series debuts
2011 Japanese television series endings
Japanese television dramas based on manga
1969 manga
Shōjo manga